The Callosciurinae are an Asiatic subfamily of squirrels containing over 60 species (mostly found in South East Asia) named after the genus Callosciurus, which means "beautiful squirrels".

Classification
Family Sciuridae
Subfamily Callosciurinae
Tribe Callosciurini
Callosciurus - Beautiful squirrels (15 species)
Dremomys     - Red-cheeked squirrels or Asian montane squirrels (six species)
Exilisciurus - Asian pygmy squirrels (three species)
Glyphotes    - sculptor squirrel
Hyosciurus   - Long-nosed squirrels (two species)
Lariscus     - Striped ground squirrels (four species)
Menetes      - Berdmore's ground squirrel or Indochinese ground squirrel
Nannosciurus - Black-eared pygmy squirrel
Prosciurillus- Dwarf squirrels or Sulawesi tree squirrels (five species)
Rhinosciurus - Shrew-faced squirrel
Rubrisciurus - Red-bellied squirrel or Sulawesi giant squirrel
Sundasciurus - Sunda tree squirrels (two subgenera, 15 species)
Tamiops      - Asiatic striped squirrels (four species)
Tribe Funambulini
Funambulus - palm squirrels (two subgenera, five species)

References

Callosciurinae
Mammal subfamilies
Taxa named by R. I. Pocock